Wilhelm Frimann Krog (1767–1825) was a Norwegian civil servant and politician.  He served as the County Governor of Stavanger county from 1814 until 1824.

Biography
From 1799 until 1805, he was the Sysselmann (Governor) for Hunevad county in Iceland. From 1805 to 1814, he was the bailiff for Jæren and Dalane.  Then from 1814 to 1824 he was the Governor of Stavanger Amt.

Krog was the son of Truls Christian Krog (1722–1806), the parish priest at Falnes Church, and Helene Sophie Meyer. He married Drude Marie Heiberg in 1801 and together, they had 8 children.

References

1767 births
1825 deaths
Norwegian expatriates in Iceland
County governors of Norway